Stephen Roberts may refer to:
 Stephen Roberts (footballer, born 1980), former Welsh football player
 Stephen Roberts (Australian footballer) (born 1948), former Australian rules footballer
 Stephen Roberts (darts player) (born 1957), English darts player
 Stephen Roberts (director) (1895–1936), American film director
 Stephen Henry Roberts (1901–1971), Australian historian and university vice-chancellor
 Stephen Roberts (historian) (born 1958), historian of 19th-century Britain
 Stephen Roberts (priest) (born 1958), English Anglican priest
 Stephen J. Roberts (1915–2005), American veterinarian, professor at Cornell University, polo player and coach
 Stephen Cornelius Roberts (born 1952), American painter

See also
 Steven Roberts (disambiguation)